Till Death... is a British sitcom of six episodes that was produced by ATV and aired on ITV from 22 May to 3 July 1981. It is a continuation of the BBC sitcom Till Death Us Do Part that aired from 1965 to 1975. The title was changed to Till Death... because the title Till Death Us Do Part was controlled by the BBC.

Series
The show saw the return of East End bigot Alf Garnett (Warren Mitchell). He and his wife Else (Dandy Nichols) have now retired to Eastbourne. They are sharing a bungalow with Min (Patricia Hayes) following the death of her husband Bert. Mike and Rita, characters from Till Death Us Do Part, were no longer main characters. Una Stubbs returned for three episodes as Rita together with her son Michael, but although her layabout husband Mike was talked about, he was never seen.

Michael (born in Till Death Us Do Part in September 1972) had seemingly become a victim of soap opera rapid aging syndrome as he had reached the age of 16 and become a punk rocker, much to Alf's dismay.

The show was not as successful as its predecessor, mainly because of the huge differences from Till Death Us Do Part. When ATV's successor, Central Television, began transmission in 1982, they came to the decision to discontinue the series.

Main cast
Warren Mitchell – Alf Garnett
Dandy Nichols – Elsie "Else" Garnett
Patricia Hayes – Min Reed
Una Stubbs – Rita Rawlins
John Fowler – Michael Rawlins Jr

Crew
Johnny Speight – writer
William G. Stewart – director / producer

DVD release
Till Death...: The Complete Series was released on DVD on 28 January 2019.

References

External links

1981 British television series debuts
1981 British television series endings
1980s British sitcoms
English-language television shows
ITV sitcoms
Till Death Us Do Part
Television series by ITV Studios
Television shows produced by Associated Television (ATV)
Television shows set in Sussex
British television spin-offs